Ham Green Halt was a railway station near Bristol, England, on the Portishead Railway, opened in 1926 to serve Ham Green Hospital.

History
The station was opened by the Great Western Railway on 23 December 1926.

The station was closed by British Railways on 7 September 1964.

References 

Former Great Western Railway stations
Disused railway stations in Somerset
Railway stations in Great Britain opened in 1926
Railway stations in Great Britain closed in 1964
Beeching closures in England